Oisu is a small borough in Türi Parish, Järva County in central Estonia.

References

Boroughs and small boroughs in Estonia